Sean Gerard Mathias (born 14 March 1956) is a Welsh actor, director, and writer. He is known for directing the film Bent and for directing highly acclaimed theatre productions in London, New York City, Cape Town, Los Angeles and Sydney.

He was included in the 2006 list of the 101 most influential gay and lesbian people in Britain in the Independent on Sunday's Pink List.
Mathias is co-owner of The Grapes pub along with business partners Ian McKellen and Evgeny Lebedev, since September 2011.

Career

Actor
Mathias began his acting career by appearing on the television screen in a small role on an episode of the cult BBC TV series Survivors, in 1977. Also in 1977, he played an Irish Guards lieutenant in the film A Bridge Too Far.

In 1978, Mathias appeared in a production at the Edinburgh Festival Fringe, during which time he met actor Ian McKellen who subsequently became his lover of about nine years.

Mathias' acting career continued into the 1980s with minor appearances on TV and in films such as Priest of Love (1981), which starred McKellen as D. H. Lawrence, and The Scarlet Pimpernel (1982), starring Anthony Andrews, Jane Seymour and McKellen. He made one notable appearance in the 1988 film White Mischief as Gerald Portman.

Another notable TV appearance was on the TV show Minder in 1982. The episode was entitled "Broken Arrow" and, in it, Mathias played the part of a young darts player named Dafydd.

Writer
Mathias's play Cowardice was produced at the Ambassadors Theatre in London in August 1983, starring Ian McKellen, Janet Suzman and Nigel Davenport and received poor reviews. He followed it with Infidelities, which premiered at the Edinburgh Festival Fringe in 1985 before transferring to London's Donmar Warehouse.

In 1987, A Prayer For Wings, directed by Joan Plowright, was produced in Edinburgh and, after winning a Fringe First awards, transferred to the Bush Theatre in London. Later plays include Poor Nanny in 1989, and Swansea Boys in 1990.

His writing also includes a novel, Manhattan Mourning, published in 1988, and the BBC TV film The Lost Language of Cranes, broadcast in 1992.

A friend of Ian Charleson, whom he also directed in Bent, Mathias contributed a chapter to the 1990 book, For Ian Charleson: A Tribute.

Theatre director
Mathias' career as a theatre director began in 1988 with Exceptions.

In 1989, he directed a revival of Bent at the Adelphi Theatre, the award-winning play by Martin Sherman that had opened on Broadway in 1979 starring McKellen. Performed as a benefit, that performance featured McKellen, Richard E Grant, Ian Charleson and Ralph Fiennes. After receiving critical acclaim, Mathias directed a full run in 1990 at the National Theatre with McKellen alongside Paul Rhys and Christopher Eccleston, winning the City Limits Award for Revival of the Year.

Mathias went on to direct theatrical plays both in London and on Broadway, including Pam Gems' adaptation of Chekhov's Uncle Vanya with McKellen and Antony Sher in 1992 at the Royal National Theatre; Alan Bennett's Talking Heads (again with McKellen), and Noel and Gertie starring Patricia Hodge and Edward Petherbridge.

In 1994, Mathias won the London Critics Circle Theatre Award for Best Director for Noël Coward's Design for Living (with Rachel Weisz, Clive Owen, Paul Rhys and Rupert Graves) and Jean Cocteau's Les Parents terribles, starring Sheila Gish, Frances de la Tour, Alan Howard and Jude Law. The latter transferred to the Ethel Barrymore Theatre on Broadway in April 1995 as Indiscretions, with Law joined by Kathleen Turner, Eileen Atkins, Roger Rees and Cynthia Nixon. It earned nine Tony Award nominations including Best Director of a Play.

Mathias directed his first Stephen Sondheim musical, A Little Night Music, at the West End  National Theatre in October 1995, with Judi Dench and Siân Phillips.  
 He had worked with Phillips before, directing her in another Pam Gems adaptation, Henrik Ibsen's Ghosts at the Sherman Theatre in Cardiff in 1993. Mathias worked with Siân Phillips again in 1997, directing her as Marlene Dietrich in Marlene, which transferred to Broadway in 1999 and received two Tony Award nominations.

Other London directorial credits include Antony and Cleopatra, starring Alan Rickman and Helen Mirren, in 1998, and Tennessee Williams' Suddenly Last Summer with Sheila Gish in April to July 1999 at the Comedy Theatre.

Mathias' career then moved to New York, where, in October 2001, he directed McKellen and Helen Mirren in August Strindberg's Dance of Death on Broadway. 
 He went on to direct this in London and Sydney in 2003. Also, in March 2001, he directed an Off-Broadway production of Servicemen by Evan Smith. He followed this in April 2002 with a Broadway revival of The Elephant Man starring Billy Crudup at the Royale Theatre.

In 2002, he returned to Sondheim to direct Company at the Kennedy Center Eisenhower Theater in Washington, D.C. in 2002, as part of its Sondheim Celebration, with a cast including John Barrowman and Lynn Redgrave. Speaking to the Stephen Sondheim Society at the time, he said: "I always wanted to do Company; it's the first musical I ever fell in love with." As a youngster in South Wales, Mathias said, he used to listen to the original Broadway recording of the show and sing "The Ladies Who Lunch" with friends: "I couldn't believe the songs, the cynicism, the sexuality."

For the 2004 Christmas season, Mathias directed the pantomime Aladdin at the Old Vic in London, with McKellen as Widow Twankey alongside Maureen Lipman, Roger Allam and Joe McFadden. Due to its huge success, Mathias reunited with McKellen and Allam for a second run the following Christmas, with Frances Barber in the cast.

In 2005, Mathias directed Rebecca Lenkiewicz's Shoreditch Madonna at the Soho Theatre in London, starring Francesca Annis and Leigh Lawson. He returned to the US to direct Anton Chekhov's The Cherry Orchard, with Annette Bening, Alfred Molina and Lothaire Bluteau, which opened at the Mark Taper Forum in Los Angeles in February 2006.

Mathias has had a home in South Africa since 1997 after visiting the country with the National Theatre in 1994 for a series of workshops. He made his South African directing debut in July 2004 with Jean Anouilh's Antigone at the Rhodes Theatre at the Grahamstown National Arts Festival, starring the South African actor John Kani. "I had fallen out of love with London," he told the Financial Times in October 2004. "I felt I had exhausted my life in London. I couldn't invent myself any more. My life was frenetic and there was never time to absorb experiences. Then I had a series of deaths of people close to me, my mother died and a long-term relationship broke up. After that, right then, I felt I had failed." In 2007, he directed novelist Edna O'Brien's play, Triptych, in Johannesburg, starring leading South African actor Dorothy-Anne Gould.

He began 2008 by directing a revival of Ring Round the Moon, Christopher Fry's adaption of Jean Anouilh's comedy, L'Invitation au Château, starring Angela Thorne at the West End Playhouse Theatre (opening in February 2008). He followed this with the UK production of Triptych at the London Southwark Playhouse in April 2008.

He directed McKellen and Patrick Stewart in Samuel Beckett's Waiting for Godot, which toured the UK in early 2009 before opening at the Theatre Royal Haymarket, London in May 2009. It was his first production as 2009 artistic director of the Theatre Royal Haymarket.

His second play at the Theatre Royal Haymarket was a stage version of Truman Capote's Breakfast at Tiffany's, adapted for the stage by British playwright Samuel Adamson and starring Anna Friel, which opened in September 2009, with some critics commenting negatively on the adaptation though noting the actors' "good performances" and the play's "fluent staging".

Mathias directed Waiting For Godot and No Man's Land in repertory on Broadway at the Cort Theatre again starring Ian McKellen and Patrick Stewart. The plays ran from November 2013 to 30 March 2014 to rave reviews – with Ben Brantley of The New York Times calling them "Absurdly Enjoyable" and "...these productions find the pure entertainment value in existential emptiness."

Film director
Although his focus is on theatre direction, Mathias is also known as a film director because of his first feature film, Bent, based on the play that propelled him to success. Released in 1997, it starred Clive Owen alongside McKellen, Mick Jagger, Rupert Graves, Jude Law and Lothaire Bluteau. It won the Prix de la Jeunesse at the Cannes film festival.

Mathias has been planning to direct a new film set in South Africa and titled The Colossus, which he has adapted from the Ann Harries novel Manly Pursuits. Actors lined up for roles have included Rachel Weisz, Susan Sarandon, Colin Firth and Ian McKellen. As of 2010, this film project was still in its pre-production stage.

Mathias, as of 2014, is also set to direct the film Somewhat Dead, a horror- adventure- comedy film set in present-day England with a high profile cast.

Personal life
Mathias was in a relationship with actor Ian McKellen from 1978 to 1988. He married his partner Paul de Lange in South Africa in 2007.

Mathias is the co-owner of The Grapes, Limehouse with Ian McKellen and Evgeny Lebedev.

List of works

Directing 
 Exceptions (1988)
 Bent (1989), Adelphi Theatre, London
 Bent (1990), Lyttelton, National Theatre, London and Garrick Theatre, London
 Talking Heads (1990), Haymarket Theatre, London
 Noel and Gertie (1991), Duke of York's Theatre, London
 Uncle Vanya (1992), Cottesloe, National Theatre, London
 Ghosts (1993), Sherman Theatre, Cardiff
 Design for Living (1994), Donmar Warehouse, London and Gielgud Theatre, London
 Les Parents terribles (1994), Lyttelton, National Theatre, London
 A Little Night Music (1995), Olivier, National Theatre, London
 Indiscretions (formerly Les Parents terribles) (1996), Ethel Barrymore Theatre, New York City
 Marlene (1997), London
 Antony and Cleopatra (1998), Olivier, National Theatre, London
 Suddenly Last Summer (1999), Comedy Theatre, London
 Marlene (1999), Cort Theatre, Broadway
 Dance of Death (2001), Broadhurst Theatre, Broadway
 Servicemen (2001), Theater at St Clement's, Off-Broadway
 The Elephant Man (2002), Royale Theatre, Broadway
 Company (2002), Kennedy Center Eisenhower Theater, Washington, D.C.
 Dance of Death (2003), Lyric Theatre, London and Theatre Royal, Sydney
 Antigone (2004), Baxter Theatre Centre, Cape Town
 Aladdin (2004), Old Vic, London
 Shoreditch Madonna (2005), Soho Theatre, London
 Aladdin (2005), Old Vic, London
 The Cherry Orchard (2006), Mark Taper Forum, Los Angeles
 Triptych (2007), Market Theatre, Johannesburg
 Ring Round the Moon (L'Invitation au Château) (2008), Playhouse Theatre, London
 Triptych (2008), Southwark Playhouse, London
 Waiting for Godot (2009), Theatre Royal Haymarket, London
 Breakfast at Tiffany's (2009), Theatre Royal Haymarket, London
 The Syndicate (2011), Chichester Festival Theatre and Theatre Royal, Bath
 No Man's Land and Waiting for Godot (2013), Cort Theatre, Broadway (in repertory)
 No Man's Land (2016), UK Tour and Wyndham's Theatre, London
 The Exorcist (2016), Birmingham Repertory Theatre, Phoenix Theatre, London and UK tour
 Ian McKellen on Stage (2019), UK and Ireland tour, Harold Pinter Theatre, London and Hudson Theatre, Broadway
 A Prayer For Wings (2019), King's Head Theatre, London

Writing 
Source: Dollee

 Cowardice (1983), Ambassadors Theatre, London
 Infidelities (1985), Edinburgh Festival Fringe and Donmar Warehouse, London
 A Prayer For Wings (1987), Edinburgh Festival Fringe and Bush Theatre, London
 Poor Nanny (1989), King's Head Theatre, London
 Swansea Boys (1990). National Theatre Studio, London
 A Prayer For Wings (2019), King's Head Theatre, London

Acting 
 Survivors (1977) – Mike
 A Bridge Too Far (1977) – Irish Guards lieutenant
 Priest of Love (1981) – Secretary
 Minder (1982) – Dafydd
 The Scarlet Pimpernel (1982) – Dispatcher
 One Summer (1983) – Owen
 White Mischief (1987) – Gerald Portman (final film role)

Script-Writer 
 The Lost Language of Cranes (1991), BBC TV

Books 
 Manhattan Mourning, Brilliance Books, 1988,

References

External links 

 
 
 

 

1956 births
Living people
20th-century British male actors
21st-century British male actors
British film directors
British gay writers
British male film actors
British male television actors
British theatre directors
British writers
LGBT film directors
LGBT theatre directors
English LGBT writers
Male actors from Swansea